The 2017 Copa de la Reina de Fútbol was the 35th edition of the Spanish women's football national cup. It ran from 4 to 18 June 2017.

Qualification

Top eight positions of the 2016-17 Spanish First Division (provisional).

Qualified teams by community

Results

Bracket

Quarterfinals

Semifinals

Final

Goalscorers
3 goals:
 Mari Paz Vilas (Valencia)
 Sonia Bermúdez (Atlético de Madrid)

2 goals:
 Natalia Pablos (Rayo Vallecano)
 Priscila Borja (Atlético de Madrid)
 Jennifer Hermoso (Barcelona)

1 goal:

Own goal
 María Estella del Valle (playing against Atlético de Madrid)

References

Women
Copa de la Reina
Copa de la Reina de Fútbol seasons